In Youth (Chinese: 趁我们还年轻; pinyin: Chen Wo Men Hai Nian Qing) is a 2019 Chinese television series starring Zhang Yunlong, Qiao Xin, Liu Ruilin, Huang Mengying and Dai Si. Set in the 21st century, this series follows a group of university friends and their early struggles in the workplace. The drama was filmed in Beijing from August 2017 to December 2017. It aired on Dragon TV from April 13 to May 3, 2019.

Synopsis
After graduation, Lin Ziyu was fortunate enough to get a position at Feilin, an accomplished PR firm with a good reputation. Unfortunately, she immediately gets on the wrong side of her boss Fan Shuchen. At the same time, the company faces corporate leakages such that Fan Shuchen suspects that Lin Ziyu may be the culprit. The two resolves misunderstandings and work together to find the real culprit. Along the way, they start falling for each other.

Cast
Zhang Yunlong as Fan Shuchen
Qiao Xin as Lin Ziyu
Liu Ruilin as Shi Weicong
Huang Mengying as Ji Xuanli 
Dai Si as Li Yangyang 
Yao Yichen as Luo Zongliang 
Denny Huang as Ge Yihan
Wang Xiao as Yu Dong
Yi Daqian as Hong Xiaoliang

Soundtrack

Ratings

Awards and nominations

References

External links

2019 Chinese television series debuts
Television series by Jay Walk Studio
Chinese romance television series
2019 Chinese television series endings
Television series by Perfect World Pictures